In law a settlor is a person who settles property on trust law for the benefit of beneficiaries. In some legal systems, a settlor is also referred to as a trustor, or occasionally, a grantor or donor. Where the trust is a testamentary trust, the settlor is usually referred to as the testator. The settlor may also be the trustee of the trust (where he declares that he holds his own property on trusts) or a third party may be the trustee (where he transfers the property to the trustee on trusts). In the common law of England and Wales, it has been held, controversially, that where a trustee declares an intention to transfer trust property to a trust of which he is one of several trustees, that is a valid settlement notwithstanding the property is not vested in the other trustees.

Capacity to be a trustee is generally co-extensive with the ability to hold and dispose of a legal or beneficial interest in property. In practice, special considerations arise only with respect to minors and mentally incapacitated persons.

A settlor may create a trust by manifesting an intention to create it. In most countries no formalities are required to create an inter vivos trust over personal property, but there are often formalities associated with trusts over real property, or testamentary trusts. The words or acts of the settlor must be sufficient to establish an intention that either another person or the settlor himself shall be trustee of the property on behalf of the beneficiary; a general intention to benefit another person on its own is sufficient. These formalities apply to express trusts only, and not to resulting, implied or constructive trusts.

For a settlor to validly create a trust, in most common law legal systems they must satisfy the three certainties, established in Knight v Knight:

certainty of intention – whether the settlor (or testator) has manifested an intention to create a trust.
certainty of subject matter – whether the property identified as being settled is sufficiently accurately identified.
certainty of objects – the beneficiaries must be clearly ascertainable within the perpetuity period.

Where a settlement of property on a third party trustee by a settlor fails, the property is usually said to be held on resulting trusts for the settlor. However, if a settlor validly transfers property to a third party, and the words used are held not to create a trust, the usual rule is that the donee takes the property absolutely.

See also
Knight v Knight
Express trust
Offshore trust
Taxation of trusts (United Kingdom)
Trust law

Footnotes

References

Equity (law)
Legal terminology
Property law
Wills and trusts